Communauté d'agglomération Porte de l'Isère is an intercommunal structure, centred on the cities of L'Isle-d'Abeau and Bourgoin-Jallieu. It is located in the Isère department, in the Auvergne-Rhône-Alpes region, eastern France. It was created in January 2007. Its seat is in L'Isle-d'Abeau. Its area is 245.9 km2. Its population was 106,737 in 2017.

Composition
The communauté d'agglomération consists of the following 22 communes:

Bourgoin-Jallieu
Châteauvilain
Chèzeneuve
Crachier
Domarin
Eclose-Badinières
Les Éparres
Four
L'Isle-d'Abeau
Maubec
Meyrié
Nivolas-Vermelle
Ruy-Montceau
Saint-Alban-de-Roche
Saint-Quentin-Fallavier
Saint-Savin
Satolas-et-Bonce
Sérézin-de-la-Tour
Succieu
Vaulx-Milieu
La Verpillière
Villefontaine

References

Porte de l'Isere
Porte de l'Isere